Evelle Jansen Younger (June 19, 1918 – May 4, 1989) was  an American lawyer who served as the California Attorney General from 1971 to 1979. Prior to his career as Attorney General, he served as the district attorney in Los Angeles where he oversaw the prosecutions of both Charles Manson and Sirhan Sirhan. In 1978, he had an unsuccessful run as the Republican Party nominee for Governor of California and retired from politics a year later.

He joined the firm Buchalter, Nemer, Fields, & Younger as a senior partner in 1979 where he worked until his death a decade later.

Early life and education

Younger was a second cousin twice removed of the Younger Brothers, a notable 19th-century gang of American outlaws that are often associated with the Jesse James gang. He was born in Stamford, Nebraska in 1918 and received his law degree from Nebraska University.

Career

After graduating law school, Younger became an FBI Special Agent. At the age of 24, when he was one of J. Edgar Hoover's top agents, Younger became a member of CIA forerunner the Office of Strategic Services, serving in the Burma-China-India theater during World War II.

Younger served in the United States Army during World War II as well as Korea. He was a municipal judge in California from 1953 to 1958 and a superior court judge in California from 1958 to 1964, when he became district attorney of Los Angeles County. He also rose to the rank of Major General in the US Air Force Reserve, and was the first to be promoted to the rank of Brigadier General (Reserve) as a Special Agent in the AF Office of Special Investigations.

Early in his career as a judge, Younger hosted KTLA's weekly crime drama "Armchair Detective," and was later a consultant and presiding judge on the reality show "Traffic Court" on KABC-TV. He also authored the book Judge and Prosecutor in Traffic Court.

During his time as the Los Angeles district attorney, he oversaw criminal cases which included the prosecutions of Charles Manson and Sirhan Sirhan. He is the first prosecutor in the United States to prosecute mass felony charges against college campus demonstrators in the 1960s. Younger was elected as the 26th Attorney General of California, the first Republican in a generation to do so.

As the Attorney General, Younger helped develop the California Environmental Quality Act. He also advocated for a broad interpretation of its applicability, filing a brief in the landmark case Friends of Mammoth v. Board of Supervisors in 1972. The ruling in the case was considered one of the most important for environmental rulings, requiring an evaluation of environmental impact prior to any public agency sanction of new construction. In the 1978 Republican primary, Younger defeated Edward M. Davis, Kenneth L. Maddy, and Pete Wilson to win the Republican gubernatorial nomination. He was defeated in the general election by incumbent Jerry Brown.

Younger retired from public service in 1979 and joined the firm Buchalter, Nemer, Fields, & Younger as a senior partner (named Buchalter, Nemer, Fields, Chrystie and Younger at the time).

Personal life

Younger married Mildred Eberhard on July 3, 1942. Their son, Eric, was born in San Francisco in 1943.
Younger died in 1989, and is interred in the Los Angeles National Cemetery in Los Angeles, California alongside his wife, Mildred Eberhard Younger, who died in 2006.

References

External links

Biography on Attorney General site 

 

1918 births
1989 deaths
California Attorneys General
California Republicans
District attorneys in California
People from Beverly Hills, California
People from Harlan County, Nebraska
20th-century American lawyers
20th-century American politicians
Federal Bureau of Investigation agents
People of the Office of Strategic Services
Burials at Los Angeles National Cemetery
United States Army personnel of World War II
United States Army personnel of the Korean War